This is a list of schools in the United Arab Emirates, listed by emirate:

Emirate of Abu Dhabi

 Abu Dhabi International School
 Canadian International School
 American International School, Abu Dhabi
 Al Sanawbar School
 Al Ain English Speaking School
 Abu Dhabi Indian School
 Abu Dhabi Indian School-Branch 1, Al Wathba
 Abu Dhabi Model School
 ADNOC Schools
 Al Dhafra Private School
 Al Nahda National Schools
 Al Yasmina School
 Al Worood Academy
 American Community School of Abu Dhabi
 International Indian School, Abu Dhabi
 British International School, Abu Dhabi
 The British School – Al Khubairat
 Dunes International School, Abu Dhabi
 Emirates National Schools 
 Emirates Future International Academy
 GEMS American Academy, Abu Dhabi
 Indian School, Al-Ain
 Islamia English School
 Japanese School in Abu Dhabi
 Lycée Français Théodore Monod (United Arab Emirates)
 The Military High School, Al-Ain
 The Model School, Abu Dhabi
 Merryland International School
 Our Own English High School, Al Ain
 New Indian Model School, Al Ain
 Reach British School
 Raha International School
 St Joseph's School (Abu Dhabi)
 Shaikh Khalifa Bin Zayed Bangladesh Islamia School
 Bright Riders School (Abu Dhabi)
 Zayed Al Awwal Secondary School
 Sheikh Zayed Private Academy For Girls
 Sunrise English Private School
 Sheikh Zayed Private Academy For Boys
 Al Saad Indian School, Al Ain
 Madar International School
 Diyafah International School

Emirate of Ajman

Indian School Ajman
 British International School, Ajman
 Woodlem Park School, Ajman
 The Royal Academy, Ajman
 Al Ameer English School, Ajman
 Habitat Private School
 International Indian School Ajman
 City School Ajman
 Ajman Academy
 Ajman Modern School
 Applied Technology High School
 Delhi Private School, Ajman

Emirate of Dubai

 Al Mawakeb School - Al Barsha
 Al Mawakeb School - Al Garhoud
 Al Mawakeb School - Al Khawaneej
 American Academy in Al-Mizhar
 American School of Creative Science Al Barsha, Dubai
 American School of Dubai
 Amled School Dubai
 Apple International School
 Arab Unity School
 Arcadia School
 Buds Public School, Dubai
 Cambridge International School, Dubai
 The City School International
 Clarion School, Dubai
 Credence High School, Dubai
 Deira International School, Dubai
 Delhi Private School, Dubai
 Dubai American Academy
 Dubai British School
 Dubai Carmel School
 Dubai College
 Dubai English Speaking College
 Dubai Gem Private School
 Dubai Heights Academy in Al-Barsha South
 Dubai International Academy
 Dubai International School
 Dubai Japanese School
 Dubai National Charity School
 Dubai National School, Al Barsha
 Dubai National School, Al Twar
 Dubai Scholars Private School
 Dwight School, Dubai
 Emirates International School – Jumeirah
 English College Dubai
 English Language School, Dubai
 GEMS Founders School - Al Barsha 
 GEMS Legacy School (Previously known as The Kindergarten Starters)
 GEMS Modern Academy 
 GEMS New Millennium School 
 GEMS Royal Dubai School, Al-Mizhar
 GEMS Wellington Academy - Al Khail
 GEMS Wellington Academy - Silicon Oasis
 GEMS Wellington International School
 GEMS World Academy
 GEMS Winchester School
 Greenfield Community School
 Greenwood International School
 Gulf Indian High School
 Gulf Model School
 Global Indian International School
 Horizon English School, Dubai
 Horizon International School, Dubai
 International School of Creative Science Nad Al Sheba, Dubai
 International School of Choueifat, Dubai
 The Central School, Dubai
 The Indian High School, Dubai
 The Winchester School, Jebel Ali
 JSS Private School
 JSS International School
 Jumeira Baccalaureate School
 Jumeirah College
 Jumeirah English Speaking School JESS 
 Jumeirah International Nurseries
 Kent College Dubai
 Kings' School Dubai
 Latifa School for Girls
 Lycee Francais International de Dubai
 The Millennium School, Dubai
 Newlands School
 New Indian Model School
 Next Generation School
 Nord Anglia International School Dubai
 North American International School
 Our Own High School
 Pakistan Education Academy
 The Oxford School
 The Philippine School, Dubai
 Rashid School For Boys
 Regent International School
 Repton School Dubai
 Rising School Dubai
 Sabri Indian School, Dubai
 School of Research Science
 St. Mary's Catholic High School, Dubai
 Sunmarke School
 Swiss International Scientific School Dubai
 United International Private School, Dubai, UAE
 Uptown International School
 Westminster School, Dubai
 Woodlem Park School, Dubai

Emirate of Fujairah

 Our Own English High School, Fujairah
 St. Mary's Catholic High School, Fujairah
Pakistan Islamia Higher Secondary school, Fujairah

Emirate of Ras al-Khaimah

 Indian Public High School
 Indian School, Ras al-Khaimah
 Ras Al Khaimah Academy
 Scholars Indian School
 Emirates National School
 Alpha Private School

Emirate of Sharjah

 Scholars International Academy
 New World American Pvt School, Al Falah Suburb, Near to Sharjah National Park, Sharjah
 Wesgreen International School
 Progressive English School Sharjah
 India International School
 New Indian Model School, Sharjah
 Gems Millenium School Sharjah
 Leaders Private School Sharjah
 American Academy in Al-Mizhar
 American Community School Sharjah
 American School of Creative Science Al Layyah, Sharjah
 Al Amaal English High School
 Delhi Private School, Sharjah
 International School of Choueifat
 International School of Creative Science Muwaileh, Sharjah
 Our Own English High School, Sharjah
 Sharjah American International School
 Sharjah English School
 Sharjah Indian School
 ASPAM Indian International School
 Al Wahda Private School
 Sharjah British International School Sharjah
 PACE British School, Sharjah
 PACE International School
 School of Knowledge
 Leaders Private School
 Al Ma'arifa International Private  School

Emirate of Umm al-Quwain

 Al Ameer Secondary School 
Choueifat School Umm Al Quwain 
Delhi Private School, Umm Al Quwain
East English School 
Elite American Private School UAQ
New Indian School Umm Al Quwain 
Sharjah American School UAQ 
The English School, Umm al-Quwain 
Umm Al Qura Private School

See also

 List of universities and colleges in the United Arab Emirates
 Education in the United Arab Emirates

References

External links

https://www.moe.gov.ae/ - UAE Government Ministry of Education (MOE) official website
https://whichschooladvisor.com/uae/school-search - Links to reviews and live data for 517 independent, international schools in the UAE
http://www.dubaifaqs.com/schools-list-uae.php - UAE school list selector
[https://schoolscompared.com/guides/a-level
https://schoolscompared.com/guides/a-level] - Comparitive site defining differences between schools including fees and subjects studied, with independent reviews for parents

United Arab Emirates

Schools
Schools
Schools
United Arab Emirates